Carlos Zarate may refer to:

Carlos Zárate Fernández (born 1980), Spanish cyclist
Carlos Zárate Serna (born 1951), Mexican boxer
Carlos Isagani Zarate (born 1967), Filipino lawyer, activist, and politician
Carlos Serrano Zárate (born 1998), Paralympian swimmer from Colombia
Carlos Zárate Jr. (born 1988), boxer from Mexico